Serhat Çetin (born 23 February 1986) is a Turkish professional basketball player, who lastly played for CSO Voluntari of the Liga Națională.

Professional career
He started his professional career in Efes Pilsen. In 2004, he moved to Tekelspor. After a successful season, he signed a contract with Galatasaray Cafe Crown.

He signed with Pınar Karşıyaka in 2006. During 2006-07 season, he averaged 10.1 points, 2.9 rebounds, 2.6 assists and 1.1 steals in 30 games. With that performance, he drew the attention of Fenerbahçe.

Before the 2007-08 season, he has been the third transfer of Fenerbahçe after Emir Preldžić and Gašper Vidmar. He spent three seasons there, usually being a role player.

He went to Beşiktaş Milangaz at the beginning of the 2010-11 season. The next year, he had already become an important part of the team. Led by coach Ergin Ataman, they won the 2011–12 Turkish Cup Basketball, beating Banvit B.K. and Çetin was named the Turkish Basketball Cup MVP for his performance. Beşiktaş went on winning the 2011–12 FIBA EuroChallenge in Debrecen. Beşiktaş also won the 2011–12 Turkish Basketball League, completing the treble.

After that legendary season, Beşiktaş dealt with financial problems and many star players departing. They brought their former player Erman Kunter as the new coach. Despite these bad conditions, Çetin decided to stay and helped the team win the Super Cup against Anadolu Efes. Before the 2013–14 season, he didn't renew his expired contract and went to Tofaş

On 8 July 2014, he signed a three-year contract with Fenerbahçe.

On 20 August 2015, he signed with Darüşşafaka for the 2015–16 season.

On 10 October 2016, he signed with Türk Telekom.

On 28 July 2019, he has signed with CSO Voluntari of the Liga Națională.

References

External links
 Serhat Çetin at eurobasket.com
 Serhat Çetin at euroleague.net
 Serhat Çetin at tblstat.net
 
 

1986 births
Living people
Alpella basketball players
Beşiktaş men's basketball players
Competitors at the 2013 Mediterranean Games
Darüşşafaka Basketbol players
Fenerbahçe men's basketball players
Galatasaray S.K. (men's basketball) players
Karşıyaka basketball players
Mediterranean Games gold medalists for Turkey
Mediterranean Games medalists in basketball
Shooting guards
Small forwards
Basketball players from Istanbul
Tofaş S.K. players
Turkish men's basketball players
Türk Telekom B.K. players